Darya Vyacheslavovna Lebesheva (born 6 April 1995 in Moscow) is a Belarusian tennis player.

Lebesheva has won two singles and two doubles titles on the ITF tour in her career. On 26 August 2013, she reached her best singles ranking of world number 505. On 18 March 2013, she peaked at world number 339 in the doubles rankings. In April 2012, Lebesheva made her debut for the Belarus Fed Cup team.

ITF finals (4–6)

Singles (2–1)

Doubles (2–5)

Fed Cup participation

Doubles

References

External links 
 
 
 

1995 births
Living people
Tennis players from Moscow
Belarusian female tennis players
Universiade medalists in tennis
Universiade bronze medalists for Belarus
Medalists at the 2013 Summer Universiade